Yakutia (also known as the Sakha-Yakutia Republic) is one of the twenty-four participating countries and regions competing in the Turkvision Song Contest.

History

2013
Yakutia made their debut in the Turkvision Song Contest at the 2013 festival, in Eskişehir, Turkey, their participation was announced on 4 December 2013, Olga Spiridonova was announced as the singer. Yakutia performed 20th in the semi final but failed to qualify for the final.

2014
On 15 October 2014, Yakutia again confirmed their participation in the contest with Vladlena Ivanova Sakhaya announced as their singer. Vladlena Ivanova Sakhaya sang "Kyn". Yakutia performed 14th in the semi-final before Turkey and after Kyrgyzstan, they qualified for the final scoring 168 points. Yakutia on the night of the semi-final were not announced as a qualifier due to voting irregularities, the organisers later allowed 15 countries to qualify for the final meaning Yakutia qualified. In the final Yakutia performed 9th after Turkmenistan and before Bulgaria, they came 7th with 183 points.

2020
After initially ruling out participation in the 2020 contest, it was later confirmed that Yakutia would return to the contest, represented by the singer Umsuura. She performed the song "Mokhsoğollor", placing 2nd with 204 points, Yakutia's best result to date.

Participation overview

See also
 Russia in the Turkvision Song Contest

References 

Turkvision
Countries in the Turkvision Song Contest